The Taylor Rosamond Motel Historic District encompasses two historically significant properties at 316 Park Avenue in Hot Springs, Arkansas.  The motel on the site consists of two eight-room buildings, one stepped up the hillside perpendicular to the road, the other near the rear of the property parallel to the road.  At the center of the property stands the Italianate stone house of W.S. Sorrell, built sometime between 1908 and 1915, and now used by the motel's owner.  The motel, built about 1950, is one of the first to be built in the city, beginning a trend away from the older model of tourist courts.

The property was listed on the National Register of Historic Places in 2004.

See also
National Register of Historic Places listings in Garland County, Arkansas

References

Italianate architecture in Arkansas
Buildings and structures completed in 1950
Buildings and structures in Hot Springs, Arkansas
Historic districts on the National Register of Historic Places in Arkansas
National Register of Historic Places in Hot Springs, Arkansas